James Proctor was a priest in England during the  16th century.

A Cistercian, he was educated at the University of Oxford. He held livings at Islip (perhaps), Thornton (Richmondshire), Normanton-upon-Soar, Binbrook,  Abbots Ripton, Winterbourne Gunner, Berwick St Leonard, Malmesbury, East Hendred and  Bratton Fleming. He was Archdeacon of Dorset from 1572 until 1575.

References 

Alumni of the University of Oxford
16th-century English people
Archdeacons of Dorset
English Cistercians